Tsesarevich (sometimes transliterated as Cesarevich or Caesarevich) was the title of the heir apparent or heir presumptive to the emperors of Russia.

Tsesarevich may also refer to:
 Cesarewitch Handicap, a British horse race
 Russian battleship Tsesarevich, a Russian battleship